The 2026 Mecklenburg-Vorpommern state election will be held in 2026 to elect the 9th Landtag of Mecklenburg-Vorpommern.

Opinion polls

References

See also 

Elections in Mecklenburg-Western Pomerania
2026 elections in Germany